The Old Bell is a grade II* listed public house in Hemel Hempstead, Hertfordshire, England. It dates from the early 18th century and is built on the site of earlier inn that dated from 1603.

References

External links
 https://whatpub.com/pubs/MCH/358/old-bell-hemel-hempstead

Buildings and structures in Hemel Hempstead
Grade II* listed pubs in Hertfordshire